The Walking Dead: Michonne is an episodic adventure video game by Telltale Games., based on The Walking Dead comic book series. Taking place between issues 126 and 139 of the comic series, the game shows events of what Michonne was up to during her temporary departure from the group of survivors led by Rick Grimes in the midst of a zombie apocalypse. Samira Wiley voiced Michonne in the game. The three-episode series was released between February and April 2016 for Microsoft Windows personal computers, PlayStation 3, PlayStation 4, Xbox 360 and Xbox One consoles, and mobile devices.

Plot

The three episode miniseries follows Michonne's journey after leaving Rick Grimes' trusted group in issue 126, and what brought her back to the group in issue 139. It also serves as a tie-in between the existing The Walking Dead seasons developed by Telltale Games.

The story begins with Michonne on a boat with four men, having flashbacks about abandoning her two daughters, Colette and Elodie. She considers suicide, and if she proceeds, she is stopped in the act by Pete, the boat's leader. They receive a radio signal from an area known as Mobjack, and Michonne and Pete disembark to the area, leaving behind their three crew members – Siddiq, Oak (a British immigrant), and Berto – onto Pete's boat. Their search leads them to an abandoned boat. Upon entering, they find two people chained to the doors, shot in the head, to ensure they couldn't turn to walkers. They scavenge around, but are ambushed by Samantha and Greg Fairbanks – two siblings also searching for supplies. Whilst fighting off walkers, the group is taken hostage by Randall, a man part of a larger group under the leadership of his sister, Norma, who are hunting Sam and Greg for stealing their supplies from their town. 

The group is taken to a bayou-like community called Monroe, where Michonne and Samantha are left in a ship's storage room, where Samantha apologizes for her behavior and tries to get Michonne to ambush Randall – a choice for the player. Randall brings Michonne up to Norma. Michonne is questioned by Norma, where the player can comply or refuse. Norma warns Michonne that Samantha is a liar and that she shouldn't be trusted. Greg is also brought up for questioning, though he lies to Norma, forcing Michonne to either help him, herself, or keep silent.

Randall forces Zachary, a young member of the ship, to question Michonne, Greg, and Samantha. Zachary unintentionally shoots Greg, forcing Michonne to destroy his brain so he doesn't turn. A distraught Samantha tries to get revenge by killing Zachary, something Michonne can agree or disagree with. Either way, Michonne, and Sam rescue Pete and they fight their way out of Monroe. If Zachary was spared, he would, together with his boyfriend Jonas, assist Michonne and Sam to escape to repay Michonne for sparing his life. Pete offers to give himself up to save Michonne and Sam, something Michonne can agree or disagree with. Sam suggests that they hide at her family's home, but is shot in the shoulder and wounded by Randall during their escape. 

The group arrives at Sam's home where they meet her father, John, her younger brothers, James and Alex, and her best friend, Paige. With the help of the family, Michonne removes the bullet from Sam's shoulder and cauterizes her wound – saving her life. While Sam rests, Michonne learns from both Paige and John that Sam's mother had committed suicide due to the harsh reality of the apocalypse, which takes a toll on the family. 

By neglecting to close their gate, John is suddenly shot and killed by Randall, who assaults the house with the assistance of two other men from Monroe. Michonne and Pete (if he didn't leave) manage to kill the two men and, with the help of Paige, manages to subdue Randall and hold him hostage in the house's garage. Norma tries to contact Randall via radio demanding to know his whereabouts. Michonne can realize that Randall could be used as a bargaining chip and can tell Norma that Randall has been captured and awaits her arrival to reclaim him. Alternatively, she can choose not to answer the radio or somehow cheat Norma. As the rest of the group prepare for the upcoming conflict, Randall tries to provoke Michonne and coerce her into killing him, something Michonne can agree or disagree with.

Sam then storms off to bury her father, as her bandage is ripped off, and argues with Paige about what happened. She apologizes to Michonne due to her agreements behavior, thanking Michonne for helping her and tries to bring her father to the grave, something Michonne can agree or disagree with.

Norma and the remaining survivors of Monroe arrive at the house and ask Michonne to exchange Randall for the rest of Pete's crew, who is revealed to have been captured. If Randall was murdered, they attempt to cheat Norma with his now reanimated corpse. The exchange goes smoothly at first, with Norma releasing Siddiq first until an angry Monroe survivor (such as Jonas or Gabby) kills one of Pete's men Berto as revenge for the destruction of Monroe (Jonas would do it if Zachary was killed, while Gabby would be the one killing Berto if Zachary was spared). This provokes a gunfight between the two groups which attracts the attention of a herd of walkers and killed Gabby or Jonas (depending on whoever is the one that killed Berto). Michonne would have to choose either to hand over Randall or not. If she said no, Norma would kill Oak, the last person she still held hostage. If she agreed to, Oak would be released. Regardless, another gunfight would happen again right after Randall is killed. During the gunfight, Norma attacks Michonne, and the two fight until Michonne cuts off Norma's arm and lets her get devoured by walkers. Alternatively, Michonne can choose to put Norma out of her misery before the walkers can kill her. Michonne and her group retreat to the house to hold the fort, but two Monroe men throw bottle bombs into the house, setting it ablaze. 

Michonne and Sam make their way through the burning house to find James and Alex, who have hidden upstairs. As they climb out of an open window, Michonne is faced with a hallucination in which she first left Colette and Elodie with her ex-husband shortly before the outbreak. She is given the choice of whether or not to leave her children once again. If Michonne decides to stay, Sam manages to grab Michonne and push her out of the house but ends up dying in the process. If Michonne decides to leave, she apologizes for leaving them and she and Sam manage to escape the house with no other casualties. 

Michonne, Pete, and his crew make their way back to their boat, where they plan to scavenge supplies from the remains of Monroe and promise to drop off Sam (if alive), Paige, James, and Alex somewhere safe up north. Michonne believes that she may have moved past the hallucinations and expresses her survivor's guilt to Pete, who suggests that she return to the Alexandria Safe-Zone and rejoin Rick Grimes' group, something the player can consider. As the rest of the group heads back to the boat, Michonne sees another distant hallucination of Colette and Elodie. Although reluctant, Michonne decides not to pursue them and follows the rest of the group back to the boat.

Episodes
The game was separated into three episodes, released in one-month intervals.

Development
In June 2015, Telltale announced a three-episode series The Walking Dead: Michonne. The mini-series was originally scheduled to be released as downloadable content for Season 2. However, in December 2015 Telltale announced that the game would be released in February 2016 as a standalone title that would not require any previous game in the series to play.

The Walking Dead: Michonne was the first game developed under a partial reworking of the new Telltale Tool, the game's engine, that provided better support for newer consoles, particularly with DirectX. The completely reworked Telltale Tool was completed for Telltale's next release, Batman: The Telltale Series.

Soundtrack
On September 10, 2019, an official soundtrack album of Jared Emerson-Johnson's score to the game was released for digital download and on streaming services, with a special edition set of vinyl lps due to release shortly thereafter.

Reception 

The Walking Dead: Michonne received mixed reviews from critics. It received praise for its atmosphere, action sequences, and the character development of Michonne, but was criticized for its story, side characters, short episode lengths, and graphical glitches.

Episode 1: In Too Deep
Aggregating review website Metacritic gave the Microsoft Windows version 69/100 based on 42 reviews, the PlayStation 4 version 70/100 based on 10 reviews, and the Xbox One version 65/100 based on 9 reviews.

Episode 2: Give No Shelter
Aggregating review website Metacritic gave the Microsoft Windows version 66/100 based on 24 reviews, the PlayStation 4 version 82/100 based on 5 reviews, and the Xbox One version 78/100 based on 6 reviews.

Episode 3: What We Deserve
Aggregating review website Metacritic gave the Microsoft Windows version 71/100 based on 23 reviews, the PlayStation 4 version 76/100 based on 8 reviews, and the Xbox One version 73/100 based on 4 reviews.

References

External links 
 

2016 video games
Android (operating system) games
Interquel video games
IOS games
Episodic video games
MacOS games
PlayStation 3 games
PlayStation 4 games
Telltale Games games
Point-and-click adventure games
Michonne
Video games about mental health
Video games developed in the United States
Video games featuring black protagonists
Video games featuring female protagonists
Video games scored by Jared Emerson-Johnson
Video games with cel-shaded animation
Video games set in Maryland
Video games set in Virginia
Windows games
Xbox 360 games
Xbox Cloud Gaming games
Xbox One games